Yi Hu is an engineer with Quanta Technology in Raleigh, North Carolina. He was named a Fellow of the Institute of Electrical and Electronics Engineers (IEEE) in 2015 for his contributions to wide-area synchronized measurement systems.

References

External links
Yi Hu on Quanta Technology

20th-century births
Living people
Chinese engineers
Fellow Members of the IEEE
Year of birth missing (living people)
Place of birth missing (living people)